In Greek mythology, Agelasta (Ancient Greek: Ἀγέλαστος or Modern Greek: Αγέλαστη means "smile-less") was the name of the stone on which Demeter rested during her search for Persephone.

In modern culture, Agelasta inspired the title of a documentary by Philippos Koutsaftis (Φίλιππος Κουτσαφτής), called Agelastos Petra - Αγέλαστος Πέτρα "smile-less stone" (2000) on Modern Eleusis.

Locations in Greek mythology